The YMCA Building is located in Racine, Wisconsin. It was added to the National Register of Historic Places in 1982. It was designed by James Gilbert Chandler.

References

Clubhouses on the National Register of Historic Places in Wisconsin
Racine
Buildings and structures in Racine, Wisconsin
Queen Anne architecture in Wisconsin
Cultural infrastructure completed in 1886
National Register of Historic Places in Racine County, Wisconsin